KYBA (105.3 FM, "Y105 FM") is a radio station licensed to Stewartville, Minnesota, and located in Rochester, Minnesota. The station airs an adult contemporary format. It is under ownership of Townsquare Media.

It is also heard on broadcast translator K285EL 104.9 FM in Rochester.

Between mid-November and Christmas, KYBA flips to an all-Christmas music format.

On August 30, 2013, a deal was announced in which Townsquare would acquire 53 Cumulus Media stations, including KYBA, for $238 million. The deal was part of Cumulus' acquisition of Dial Global; Townsquare and Dial Global are both controlled by Oaktree Capital Management. The sale to Townsquare was completed on November 14, 2013.

References

External links
Y-105 KYBA official website

Radio stations in Minnesota
Mainstream adult contemporary radio stations in the United States
Townsquare Media radio stations